The Waihi Fault Zone is a seismically active area of the central North Island of New Zealand whose earthquakes have been associated with significant loss of life.

Geology
The intra-rift Waihi Fault Zone extends at least  from Little Waihi at Lake Taupō towards Mount Ruapehu on the west side of the mountain. It has two segments known as the Waihi North fault and the Waihi South fault and 19 fault strands (three of which were previously known as the Taurewa Fault). Together they make up the south western intra-rift faults of the Tongariro Graben in the Taupō Rift. The fault zone has the potential to be associated with up to 7.2 magnitude  earthquakes with recurrence intervals of mean 6.6 magnitude earthquakes between every 490 and 1380 years. There is now good evidence from LiDAR that it extends to the north in a three fault complex another  on land or even beyond the shore line of Lake Taupo.

Risks
Large landslides have occurred in the Hipaua Steaming Cliffs area of the Waihi fault escarpment and it is likely that some the large historical loss of life by New Zealand standards from these landslides has been related to earthquake activity on the fault.

References

Seismic faults of New Zealand
Taupō Volcanic Zone
Tongariro Volcanic Centre